The National Negro Committee (formed: New York City, May 31 and June 1, 1909 - ceased: New York City, May 12, 1910) was created in response to the Springfield race riot of 1908 against the black community in Springfield, Illinois. Prominent black activists and white progressives called for a national conference to discuss African American civil rights. They met to address the social, economic, and political rights of African Americans. This gathering served as the predecessor to the National Association for the Advancement of Colored People (NAACP), which was formally named during the second meeting in May 1910.

Origins
In early September 1908 American socialist William English Walling published an article, "Race War in the North" in The Independent. He described the massive white race riot directed at Black residents in Springfield, Illinois, hometown of late President Abraham Lincoln. The riot had resulted in seven deaths, the destruction of 40 homes and 24 businesses, and 107 indictments against mostly African Americans who had tried to defend their homes. Walling concluded by saying that a powerful body of citizens needed to come to the aid of blacks in the United States. Mary Ovington wrote to Walling about her interest in this subject and met with him at his apartment in New York City, along with social worker Dr. Henry Moskowitz.

The three decided to organize a national conference on the civil and political rights of African Americans, to be held in New York on the centennial of Lincoln's birthday, February 12, 1909. They issued a call to progressives, and many people responded. They formed the National Negro Committee, which held its first meeting in New York on May 31 and June 1, 1909, at the Henry Street Settlement House on the Lower East Side.  The group leaders initially tried to get the famous Booker T. Washington k to attend meetings to gain popularity. Although Oswald G. Villard, the grandson of William Lloyd Garrison and one of the founders, was fed up with Washington ignoring "the real injustices" that affected African Americans, Villard knew that inviting him would help the organization gain momentum. Villard told Washington that the organization would avoid allying with either the more radical activists and scholars such as W. E. B. Du Bois or the conservatism of Black Tuskegee activists, but attempt to benefit all African Americans. He nonetheless clarified that the organization would be a "radical political movement." Washington refused to attend, out of fear of ensuing Southern controversy, a concern of ruining the tone of the meeting, and a desire to avoid agitation. The Committee was not overly bothered by his absence, as Villard was more interested in attracting those like Du Bois to shake up Washington's widespread conservatism. The meetings sparked tensions with Washington and his supporters. Many of the Committee's members had been part of the Niagara Movement, which had had notoriously poor relations with Washington. The meetings also lacked many of Washington's allies, such as Andrew Carnegie, who pointedly did not attend. The Committee generated a fair amount of controversy, with some fearing that it would dramatically worsen race relations, and others expressing concern over its "political emphasis." Many claimed the Conference was "anti-Washingtonian." Nevertheless, the organizers continued on. The attendance of both Black and white activists was a positive indicator of a "successful cooperation of the races." The meetings covered topics including social and economic issues, voting rights, physiological differences between races, lynching, and education. The June 1st meeting brought about disputes between white members and Black members, who expressed a lack of trust in their white counterparts. This tension was partly due to the resurgence of the issue of courting Washington's support, this time in the context of including him in a steering committee to appeal to potential white donors. The committee was eventually formed without Washington. It also overlooked more radical members such as Ida B. Wells (although she was later included in the committee), who were not chosen in favor of more moderate members, which caused more argument. During the debates of the evening, white leaders were generally patronizing towards Black members, as Ovington herself acknowledged: I find myself still occasionally forgetting that the Negroes aren't poor people for whom I must kindly do something, and then comes a gathering such as that last evening and I learn they are men with most forceful opinions of their own.Willard even went so far as to suggest the formation of a separate group with less "trying" members. Du Bois was the eventual savior of the evening, as he managed to win over the whites. He later recounted the evening as "warm and passionate," and described a woman who stood up and "cried in passionate, almost tearful earnestness - an earnestness born of bitter experience - 'They are betraying us again - these white friends of ours.'" Following more discussion, the committee eventually came to a resolution: We agree fully with the prevailing opinion that the transformation of the unskilled colored laborers in industry and agriculture into skilled workers is of vital importance to that race and to the nation, but we demand for the Negroes as for all others a free and complete education, whether by city, state, or nation, a grammar school and industrial training for all, and technical, professional and academic education for the most gifted.Washington was, unsurprisingly, unhappy with the committee's more radical stance. The resolution also drew scathing criticism from large publications, who expressed fears of a "socialist revolution" sparked by "More Fool Negroes."

By May 1910, the National Negro Committee and attendees at its second conference organized a permanent body known as the National Association for the Advancement of Colored People (NAACP).

National Negro Committee Membership on June 1, 1909

Jane Addams
Maria Baldwin 
Dr. Charles Edwin Bentley 
Rev. Walter Henderson Brooks 
William Lewis Bulkley 
John Dewey 
W. E. B. Du Bois 
Archibald H. Grimke
Lafayette Mckeen Hershaw
Leslie Pinckney Hill
Rev. John Haynes Holmes 
Paul Kennaday 
Jacob W. Mack 
M. D. Maclean
John Elmer Milholland 
Dr. Henry Moskowitz 
Leonora O'Reilly 
Mary W. Ovington
Albert E. Pillsbury 
Charles Edward Russell 
William S. Scarborough 
Edwin R. A. Seligman 
Rev. Joseph Silverman
Dr. William Albert Sinclair 
Moorfield Storey
Charles Franklin Thwing 
Oswald G. Villard 
Lillian D. Wald 
William English Walling
Dr. Owen Meredith Waller 
Bishop Alexander Walters 
Ida Wells-Barnett
Susan Wharton 
Dr. Stephen S. Wise 
Celia Parker Woolley 
Richard Robert Wright 
Judge Wendell Philips Stafford 
Mary Church Terrell 
Rev. John Milton Waldron

References 

African Americans' rights organizations